Tweetie Pie is a 1947 Warner Bros. Merrie Melodies cartoon directed by Friz Freleng. The short was released on May 3, 1947, and stars Tweety with Sylvester the Cat, who is called "Thomas" in this cartoon.

Tweetie Pie marks the first pairing of the characters Sylvester and Tweety, and it won the Academy Award for Best Animated Short Film in 1947, breaking Tom and Jerrys streak of four consecutive wins in the category and winning Warner Bros. their first Academy Award.

Plot
Thomas the Cat (later renamed Sylvester) captures Tweety, whom he finds outside in the snow, getting warm by a smoldering cigar stub. Thomas' unseen owner, Emma, sees him and saves Tweety from being eaten by Thomas, whom she promptly reprimands when he tries to eat him again. Tweety is brought inside, and Emma warns Thomas not to bother Tweety. Ignoring this command, Thomas initiates a series of failed attempts to get Tweety from his cage, many of which end in a noisy crash that brings Emma of the house downstairs to whack Thomas with a broom while calling him names, and then finally, throw him out altogether.
	
Undeterred, Thomas tries to get back into the house through the chimney. Tweety puts wood in the fireplace, pours gasoline on it and lights it. The phoom sends Thomas flying right back up the chimney and into a bucket of frozen water.
 	
However, Thomas gets back in the house via a window in the basement (or study) and creates a Rube Goldberg-esque trap (virtually identical to one in Charles M Jones' 1945 Porky Pig short Trap Happy Porky) to capture Tweety. Of course, the trap narrowly backfires and injures Thomas instead.

Finally, Thomas tries to capture Tweety by running up to the attic and sawing a hole around Tweety's cage to remove it that way, but he instead ends up causing the entire inner ceiling to collapse (sans Tweety's cage, which is being held in place by a beam). The faux pas creates such a racket and mess that Thomas is sure that Emma will come downstairs to wallop him and possibly kick him out again, this time for good. In a desperate attempt to avoid this, he takes her broom, breaks it in half, and tosses the pieces into the lit fireplace. This proves to be meaningless, as he then immediately finds himself being walloped repeatedly with a shovel...by Tweety.

Production
When Tweety's creator, director Bob Clampett, left the Warner Bros. studio in 1945, he was working on a fourth film starring Tweety, paired with Friz Freleng's Sylvester, who previously appeared with Porky Pig in Clampett's cartoon Kitty Kornered (released in 1946). The working title for the cartoon was Fat Rat and the Stupid Cat in 1946, which would've been the first true cartoon to pair Sylvester and Tweety together. Tweety was depicted living in a bird cage, which could hint his transition from a wild baby bird to a domestic canary. Production of the fourth Tweety cartoon began roughly around the same time A Gruesome Twosome (Tweety’s last cartoon directed by Clampett) was released, around June 1945, however due to Clampett leaving Warner Bros. at the time of the cartoons development, it never entered full-production as his unit was given to Arthur Davis.

Friz Freleng at the same time was working on-a follow-up to his second Sylvester cartoon, Peck Up Your Troubles, featuring Sylvester in pursuit of a witty woodpecker. Freleng wanted to replace the woodpecker with Tweety; however, producer Edward Selzer objected, and Freleng threatened to quit. Selzer allowed Tweety to be used, and the resulting film went on to win Warner Bros.' first Oscar, which Selzer accepted. After Selzer's death in 1970, the Oscar was passed on to Freleng. The cartoon would also go on to become a phenomenal success, and as result, Tweety would always be paired with Sylvester from that point on in subsequent appearances, because the duo carried a high amount of star power. Sylvester, however, would appear in many shorts without Tweety, such as the Hippety Hopper series consisting of Hippety Hopper and Sylvester Jr. Those were directed by Robert McKimson. Sylvester also appeared alongside Speedy Gonzales and both Freleng and McKimson supervised cartoons pairing the two, and would win another Oscar for that pairing in 1955.

Home media
Although the cartoon was re-released into the Blue Ribbon program in 1955, the cartoon's original titles are known to exist. When re-released, like most Merrie Melodies at the time, the original ending bullet titles were kept. On the following sets, the Blue Ribbon re-release print is available. The original titles were found in 2011 and it is unknown if Warner Bros. is aware of their existence, since the Platinum Collection set released in 2012 still had the Blue Ribbon titles.

VHS – The Best Of Bugs Bunny and Friends
VHS – Little Tweety and Little Inki Cartoon Festival featuring "I Taw a Putty Tat"
VHS – Tweety and Sylvester
VHS – The Golden Age Of Looney Tunes Volume 6: Friz Freleng
VHS – Looney Tunes Collectors Edition Volume 15: A Battle Of Wits
Laserdisc – The Golden Age of Looney Tunes Volume 1, Side 6
DVD – Looney Tunes Golden Collection: Volume 2, Disc 3
DVD – Warner Bros. Home Entertainment Academy Awards Animation Collection: 15 Winners, Disc 1
Blu-ray – Looney Tunes Platinum Collection: Volume 1, Disc 1

References

External links

 

1947 films
1947 animated films
1947 short films
Best Animated Short Academy Award winners
Short films directed by Friz Freleng
Merrie Melodies short films
Films scored by Carl Stalling
Sylvester the Cat films
Tweety films
Animated films about birds
1940s Warner Bros. animated short films
Films with screenplays by Michael Maltese